Tom or TOM may refer to:

 Tom (given name), a diminutive of Thomas or Tomás or an independent Aramaic given name (and a list of people with the name)

Characters 
 Tom Anderson, a character in Beavis and Butt-Head
 Tom Beck, a character in the 1998 American science-fiction disaster movie Deep Impact
 Tom Buchanan, the main antagonist from the 1925 novel The Great Gatsby
 Tom Cat, a character from the Tom and Jerry cartoons
 Tom Lucitor, a character from the American animated series Star vs. the Forces of Evil
 Tom Natsworthy, from the science fantasy novel Mortal Engines
 Tom Nook, a character in Animal Crossing video game series
 Tom Servo, a robot character from the Mystery Science Theater 3000 television series
 Tom Sloane, a non-adult character from the animated sitcom Daria
 Talking Tom, the protagonist from the Talking Tom & Friends franchise
 Tom, a character from the Deltora Quest books by Emily Rodda
 Tom, a character from the 1993 action/martial arts movie Showdown
 Tom, a character from the cartoon series Tom and Jerry (Van Beuren)
 Tom, a character from the anime and manga series One Piece
 Tom (Paralympic mascot), the official mascot of the 2016 Summer Paralympics
 Tom, a fictional dinosaur from the children's cartoon Tom
 Tom, the main protagonist from the British children's live-action series Tree Fu Tom
 Tom, a character from the children's series Tots TV
 T.O.M., the robot host/mascot of Adult Swim's Toonami action block

Entertainment
 Tom (1973 film), a blaxploitation film
 Tom (2002 film), a documentary film directed by Mike Hoolboom
 Tom (instrument)
 Tom (American TV series)
 Tom (Spanish TV series)
 Tom, a 1970 album by Tom Jones
 Tom-tom drum

Geography
 Tom (Amur Oblast), in Russia, a left tributary of the Zeya
 Tom (river), in Russia, a right tributary of the Ob

Biology
 A male cat
 A male turkey

Transport
 Thomson Airways ICAO code
 Tottenham Hale station, London, England (National Rail station code)

Acronyms
  or overseas territory
 Text Object Model, a Microsoft Windows programming interface
 Theory of mind, the ability to attribute mental states to oneself and others and to understand that others have states that are different from one's own
 Translocase of the outer membrane, a protein for intracellular protein-equilibrium
 Troops Out Movement, campaigned against British involvement in Northern Ireland
 Tune-o-matic, a guitar bridge design
 Target operating model, a description of the desired state of an organizational model in a business at a chosen date

Other uses
 TOM (mascot), three Bengal tigers that have been the mascot of the University of Memphis sports teams
 Tom (pattern matching language), a programming language
 Tom, Oklahoma
 TOM Group, a Chinese media company
 TOM Online, a Chinese mobile internet company
 TOM (psychedelic)
 Tom (gender identity), a gender identity in Thailand

See also
 Tom Tom (disambiguation)
 Mount Tom (disambiguation)
 Peeping Tom (disambiguation)
 Thomas (disambiguation)
 Tom Thumb (disambiguation)
 Tomás (disambiguation)
 Tomm (disambiguation)
 Tommy (disambiguation)
 Toms (disambiguation)